KSTL is an urban gospel station located in the St. Louis, Missouri/Illinois area in the United States. Owned and operated by Church of God in Christ, Inc.

KSTL's transmitters are located in East St. Louis, just north of the I-55/Illinois Route 3 interchange.

History
KSTL was formerly located on the historic Laclede's Landing in downtown Saint Louis, but later moved to the Saint Louis suburbs, currently broadcasting out of the same building as KYFI. KSTL originally played only music, as its sister station KYFI (then KJSL) had the only studio when KSTL began. KSTL expanded its format beyond Christian music and into talk radio and ministries in 1995 and shared a studio with KJSL, eventually landing its own separate studio.

Programming
KSTL is one of 12 religious radio stations licensed to St. Louis and its metro area, according to the St. Louis Journalism review study in March 2000. KSTL is not specifically geared towards one specific religion. KSTL airs more than 120 top-rated National and Local programs throughout its schedule. The programs are primarily Christian teaching and preaching, along with traditional and Contemporary Christian music and Public affairs programming.

Personnel
The first General Manager of the station in 1994 was Taft Harris. The first Director of Operations was Juanita Winston who helmed the day-to-day operations for the station. In March 2004 Taft Harris was voted one of the Most Influential African-Americans in Radio by radioink.com.  Taft is the General Manager over WSRB/WYCA/WPWX Crawford Broadcasting stations in Chicago, Illinois.

External links 
 
 
News programming provider's website

FCC History Cards for KSTL
KSTL Collection Finding Aid at the St. Louis Public Library

STL
Gospel radio stations in the United States
STL